Your Whole Life Ahead of You is a 2008 Italian movie directed by Paolo Virzì and written by Virzì and Francesco Bruni.

Plot
The events of a freshly graduated young woman in the universe of precarious work.

Cast
 Isabella Ragonese — Marta
 Sabrina Ferilli — Daniela
 Massimo Ghini — Claudio
 Valerio Mastandrea — Giorgio
 Elio Germano — Lucio
 Micaela Ramazzotti — Sonia
 Valentina Carnelutti — Maria Chiara
 Caterina Guzzanti — Fabiana Lanza Campitelli
 Laura Morante - voce narrante (voice)
  - Lara
 Edoardo Gabbriellini - Roberto

External links
 
 
 

Films directed by Paolo Virzì
Italian romantic comedy-drama films
2000s Italian-language films
2008 films
Films based on Italian novels
2000s Italian films